The 1985 ATP Championship, also known as the Cincinnati Open, was a tennis tournament played on outdoor hard courts at the Lindner Family Tennis Center in Mason, Ohio in the United States that was part of the 1985 Nabisco Grand Prix. The tournament was held from August 19 through August 25, 1985. Fourth-seeded Boris Becker won the singles title.

Finals

Singles

 Boris Becker defeated  Mats Wilander 6–4, 6–2
 It was Becker's 3rd singles title of the year and of his career.

Doubles

 Stefan Edberg /  Anders Järryd defeated  Joakim Nyström /  Mats Wilander 4–6, 6–2, 6–3

References

External links
 
 Association of Tennis Professionals (ATP) tournament profile

Cincinnati Open
Cincinnati Masters
1985 in American tennis
Cincin